The National Academy of Performing Arts (abbreviated as NAPA) is a performing arts school located at Hindu Gymkhana in Karachi, Sindh, Pakistan. NAPA was established in 2005 as an institution to conserve and teach performing arts and music.

Departments
 Music  At NAPA, the students of music derive benefit from being taught by a faculty consisting of practicing musicians, musicologists and visiting maestros. They will also have the opportunity to enrich their repertoire of compositions and styles by tutelage under many teachers.
 Theatres Arts  The Theatre Arts department will offer students academic courses in all aspects of the theatre as well as practical exploration and the opportunity to present their work before an audience.

 Make up  NAPA has also introduced lessons in Make up.

Faculty

Chairman
Zia Mohyeddin is the current Chairman of NAPA. He was asked by Pervez Musharraf, then the President of Pakistan, to establish and lead a national institution for arts and music. Besides being the founder and chairman of NAPA, he has impeccable credentials. Trained at the Royal Academy of Dramatic Art, he has spent a lifetime dedicated to the theatre, films and television, appearing in many local and foreign productions. He has also performed in numerous Broadway and West End plays. He has also produced and directed extensively.

Notable teachers
Arshad Mehmood, Director Programmes and Administration.
Besides Mohyeddin and Mahmud, NAPA has some of the most well known theatre icons and teacher-performances in Asia, including:
 Talat Hussain
 Head of Department Theatre Studies, curriculum consultant and founder of Napa Repertory Theatre

Rahat Kazmi is the  
 Khalid Ahmed (acting teacher)
 Nafees Ahmad (sitar teacher)
 Bashir Khan (tabla teacher)
 Salamat Hussain (Flute Teacher)
 Arsalan Pareyal (Guitar Teacher)
 Shehzad Ghias Shaikh

Alumni
 Paras Masroor 1st batch theatre arts
 Rabab Hashim 1st batch theatre arts

Relocation
In December 2018, The Supreme Court of Pakistan had directed the Sindh government to shift NAPA
to another location from this Hindu Gymkhana building but, as of 11 February 2020, compliance to this directive could not be made and NAPA was still functioning there.

See also 
 National College of Arts
 The Hindu Gymkhana
 Theatre of Pakistan
 Music of Pakistan

References

External links 
 National Academy of Performing Arts (NAPA)

2005 establishments in Pakistan
Pakistan federal departments and agencies
Universities and colleges in Karachi
Art schools in Pakistan
Dance schools in Pakistan
Film schools in Pakistan
Music schools in Pakistan
Arts in Pakistan
Buildings and structures in Karachi
British colonial architecture